The Ministry of Public Administration of the Republic of Croatia is the ministry in the Government of Croatia which is in charge of the system and organization of state administration and local and regional governments, political and electoral system, personal status of citizens and other activities within its jurisdiction.

List of ministers

References

External links 
 

Public Administration
Ministries established in 2009
2009 establishments in Croatia